Cnemidochroma phyllopus is a species of beetle in the family Cerambycidae. It was described by Félix Édouard Guérin-Méneville in 1844. It is known from southeastern Brazil, Paraguay, Argentina, and Uruguay.

References

	

Callichromatini
Beetles described in 1844
Beetles of South America